The knockout stage of the men's football tournament at the 2020 Summer Olympics was played from 31 July to 7 August 2021. The top two teams from each group in the group stage qualified for the knockout stage.

All times listed are Japan Standard Time (UTC+9).

Format
In the knockout stage, if a match was level at the end of 90 minutes of normal playing time, extra time was played (two periods of 15 minutes each) and followed, if necessary, by a penalty shoot-out to determine the winner.

Qualified teams
The top two placed teams from each of the four groups qualified for the knockout stage.

Bracket

Quarter-finals

Spain vs Ivory Coast

Japan vs New Zealand

Brazil vs Egypt

South Korea vs Mexico

Semi-finals

Mexico vs Brazil

Japan vs Spain

Bronze medal match
The bronze medal match was originally scheduled to be held on 6 August 2021, 20:00. Due to the postponement of the women's football tournament gold medal match from 11:00 to 21:00, the game was moved to 18:00 on the same day at the same venue.

Gold medal match

Notes

References

External links
Men's Olympic Football Tournament Tokyo 2020, FIFA.com

Knockout stage